Hannah Trigger (born 5 February 1987) is an Australian snowboarder. She is a participant at the 2014 Winter Olympics in Sochi.

References

1987 births
Living people
Snowboarders at the 2014 Winter Olympics
Olympic snowboarders of Australia
Australian female snowboarders
21st-century Australian women